is an action game published in 1991 by Natsume, for the Game Boy and Super Nintendo Entertainment System (SNES).

Gameplay 

Spanky attacks by throwing a small purple bubble. He can then bounce the bubble on his head. Every time he bounces the bubble, the bubble grows and changes color. The bubble can then be popped, depending upon the bubble's size and color, different types of sports balls will fly out of the bubble destroying enemies touched by the balls. For example, a purple bubble will release a baseball and the largest orange bubble will release several basketballs. If an enemy is touched by a bubble, he will simply be stunned and unable to move for a moment.

There are a total of five worlds with ten levels each. After clearing each world's ten levels, the player must face a main boss. After defeating all five bosses, the player fights the witch herself. In the SNES version, levels are cleared when the required number of keys unlocks a door; in the GB version, levels are cleared when all the enemies have been destroyed. The enemies in the game are generally different types of fruits, with the notable exception of the witch.

Plot 

The SNES game has a storyline in which Spanky is trapped in a tower by an evil witch named Morticia. Spanky has to defeat Morticia and find his way out of the tower.

Development and release 

The game is known for its very upbeat jazz soundtrack by Kiyohiro Sada.

It's somewhat similar to the SNES version but differs quite a bit.

On May 26, 2021, the Super Nintendo version of the game was ported over to the Nintendo Switch for Nintendo Switch Online subscribers.

Other Media 
 Spanky from Spanky Quest makes cameo as the red corner in the Famitsu Comic '92 Barcelona Olympic.

Reception 

Spanky's Quest on both the Game Boy and SNES received average reviews from critics since their initial release.

Notes

References

External links 
 Spanky's Quest at GameFAQs
 Spanky's Quest at Giant Bomb
 Spanky's Quest (Game Boy) at MobyGames
 Spanky's Quest (SNES) at MobyGames

1991 video games
Action video games
Game Boy games
Natsume (company) games
Nintendo Switch Online games
Single-player video games
Super Nintendo Entertainment System games
Video games about primates
Video games developed in Japan
Video games scored by Hiroyuki Iwatsuki
Video games scored by Kiyohiro Sada
Video games about witchcraft